The Socialist Party of Bangladesh (abbreviated 'বাসদ', 'BASAD', or 'SPB') is an anti-revisionist Marxist-Leninist communist party in Bangladesh. The party was founded by Comrade Khalequzzaman on 7 November 1980. In 2013 a group of members under the leadership of Mubinul Haider Chowdhury broke away from the party and formed the Socialist Party of Bangladesh (Marxist) over disagreement on recognition of the thought of Shibdas Ghosh and Ganajagaranmancha.

Ideology 
SPB is an anti-revisionist Marxist-Leninist communist party. The party supports the ideologies of Karl Marx, Friedrich Engels, Vladimir Lenin, Joseph Stalin, and Mao Zedong. The SPB party holds that Bangladesh is a capitalist- semi fascist country. Following its analysis, the party seeks to establish a socialist state through Revolutionary socialism throughout Bangladesh.

Central Committee 
There are four members in the central committee of the party. Comrade Khalequzzaman is the General Secretary of Central Committee of SPB. 
Comrade Bazlur Rashid & Razequzzaman Ratan are Members of Central Committee.

Monthly newspaper 
The official party newspaper, Vanguard, is published monthly in Bengali. SPB Central Committee member Razequzzaman Ratan is the current chief editor of Vanguard newspaper.

Mass organizations of the party 
SPB has many political wings, some of them are:
 Socialist Students' Front 
 Socialist Labour Front (SLF)
 Socialist Peasants' Front (SPF)
 Socialist Women's Forum (SWF)
 Progressive Teachers' forum (PTF)
 Progressive Engineers' and Architects' Forum (PEAF)
 Progressive Lawyers' Front (PLF)
 Progressive Agriculturist Centre (PAC)
 Progressive Doctors Forum (PDF)
 Progressive Art and Mass Media Workers Forum (PAMMWF)
 Bangladesh Shipping Workers Federation  (BSWF)
 Re-rolling Steel Mills Labour Front (RSMLF)
 Charan Sangskritik Kendro
 Shishu Kishor Mela (SKM)
 Platform of Science Movement (PSM)

Socialist Students' Front

The Socialist Students' Front (SSF) is the student's wing of SPB. This organization is one of the largest leftist students' organization in the country. The slogans of the SSF are: "Socialist Students' Front, commitments to the revolution!" and "Socialist Students' Front, commitments to save the rights of education!"

The SSF was established on 21 January 1984. The main objective of the SSF is to build a students’ movement throughout the country to bring about educational reforms to make education cheap, universal, scientific, truly secular, equal, and democratic, and to create an education system that is a revolutionary movement for the overthrow of capitalism and establishment of socialist state. SSF is a member of several international students' organizations including World Federation of Democratic Youth.

References

External links
  

1980 establishments in Bangladesh
Communist parties in Bangladesh
Stalinist parties
Maoist parties
Anti-revisionist organizations
International Coordination of Revolutionary Parties and Organizations
Political parties established in 1980
Political parties in Bangladesh